Merville-Franceville-Plage is a commune in the Calvados department in the Normandy region in northwestern France.

Geography
Merville Franceville is located on the right/east side of the Baie de l'Orne.

The back country is a plain, favourable to cereal cultivation and dairy cattle.

Population

Climate
The commune has a maritime climate : Winters are warm and summers rarely suffer from excessive heat.

Sights
Redoute de Merville, fortification edified on Vauban's plans in 1779. Rediscovered by the occupying forces during the Second World War.
The Merville Gun Battery (Batterie de Merville) is an historic site situated on the eastern flank of the landing area codenamed Sword. Lieutenant-Colonel Terence Otway, and the 9th Parachute Battalion, neutralized the German battery during the Battle of Merville Gun Battery on 6 June prior to the beach landings.

Tourism
Merville Franceville is attractive for families, thanks to the various beach activities and excursions in the back-country.

This town is famous for being a good spot for kite surfing.

Twin towns
Clyst St. Mary, England
Merville, British Columbia, Canada

See also
Communes of the Calvados department

References

Photos

External links

 (fr-en) Tourist Office Website
 (fr-en) City council website

Communes of Calvados (department)
Seaside resorts in France
Calvados communes articles needing translation from French Wikipedia